Pseudocanthon perplexus, the four-toothed dung beetle, is a species of (formerly canthonini) in the family Scarabaeidae.

References

Further reading

External links

 

Deltochilini
Articles created by Qbugbot
Beetles described in 1847